Ngô Đức Kế (1878–1929) was a prominent scholar-gentry Vietnamese anti-colonial intellectual in the early 20th century. He was the publisher of an anti-French magazine in Hanoi and was sent to Côn Sơn Island, a prominent colonial jail for revolutionary dissidents.


Biography
Ke was born in the village of Trao Nha in Can Lộc District in Hà Tĩnh Province. His family had a rich tradition of leadership in the imperial service, and his father was the high level mandarin of the Nguyễn dynasty. Ke made a promising start towards emulating his forefathers, and passed the metropolitan exams in 1901. However, he did not head for the final tier of examinations, the palace examinations, and instead returned directly to his home province to teach. During his spare time, he also studied some contemporary Chinese modern learning (tan hoc) books that he had obtained in Huế. Scholars believe that early in his career, he had contact with Phan Bội Châu, the leading Vietnamese nationalist anti-colonial figure of the time, which was believed to have occurred through their mutual friend Dang Nguyen Can. However, Ke was most influenced by the ideas of the Chinese reformists K'ang Yu-wei and Lian Chi'chao, particular in the advocacy of the modernisation of the education system. He also was one of the main figures who advocated scholar gentry initiative in the opening of Vietnamese commercial businesses as a means of raising funds and awareness of their cause.

In 1908, the French launched a general crackdown on the scholar gentry anti-colonial movement, and Ke was one of the ones rounded up. He was sent to Côn Sơn Island, where there was jail specifically for detaining independence activists.

Ke was released from prison in 1921 after thirteen years in prison. He took up residence in Hanoi, where he edited a low scale periodical, the Huu Thanh. Ke earned a reputation for standing outside his office, observantly watching the vehicles roll past, the students in European dress and the women in high heels. Despite this, he declared that he was in favor of meaningful modern civilisation.

Ke also derided the way that Vietnamese employees of the French colonial system squabbled among themselves over their personal status and standing. He felt that the attention to hierarchical decorum was excessive and regressive.

Ke advocated the adoption of the Romanised quốc ngữ to replace the chữ nôm script used in Vietnam for writing. He was unlike many of his contemporaries in feeling that eh educational emphasis was not in translating old Vietnamese literature into quốc ngữ but for the introduction of European scientific, political, economic and legal knowledge to be put into quốc ngữ. He called for quốc ngữ to appeal to the needs of the wider populace, rather than only classical traditional scholars who were focused on literature. In one case, he strongly criticised the view of the mandarin Phạm Quỳnh, who strongly praised Nguyễn Du's epic romantic poem, The Tale of Kiều, which is widely considered as Vietnam's national poem. Quỳnh saw the Kieu as the soul and essence of Vietnam. Quynh felt that if the literature of Vietnam survived, then so would the language and thus the country. Ke felt the opposites, reasoning that the survival of the people was the only way to safeguard the language and thus the literary heritage.

Most cities in Vietnam, regardless of the political orientation of the government, have named major streets after him.

Notes

References

1878 births
1929 deaths
Vietnamese nationalists
Vietnamese Confucianists
People from Hà Tĩnh province